Spelocteniza is a genus of spiders in the family Microstigmatidae. It was first described in 1982 by Gertsch. , it contains only one species, Spelocteniza ashmolei, which is found in Ecuador.

References

Microstigmatidae
Mygalomorphae genera
Monotypic Mygalomorphae genera
Spiders of South America